Giani Stelian Kiriţă (born 3 March 1977 in Bucharest) is a former Romanian football player.

Club career
Giani Kiriţă was born on 3 March 1977 in Bucharest, growing up in the Pantelimon neighborhood, where he started playing football at around the age of 11 at the children's club, Turistul Lebăda. He started to play football at senior level at Divizia B club Rocar București, who after half of a season loaned him to Dinamo București, where he made his Divizia A debut on 19 April 1997 in a 3–0 victory against Universitatea Cluj. In the following season after returning to play another half of year in Divizia B at Rocar, he was transferred by Dinamo, where he would win two Divizia A titles in 2000 and 2002, at the first contributing with 32 games and 3 goals scored and in the second appearing in 28 matches in which he scored two goals, also helping the club win three Cupa României in 2000, 2001 and 2003. In 2003, Kiriță went to play in the Turkish Süper Lig at Samsunspor, Gaziantepspor, Ankaragücü and Bursaspor, with the latter managing to win the 2009–10 Süper Lig, which was the first title in the club's history, being won with one point above the team from the second place, Fenerbahçe, Kiriță appearing in 8 games in which he scored one goal in a 1–0 victory against Gaziantepspor. In January 2012, he returned to play in Romania, signing with FCM Târgu Mureș, where he made his last Divizia A appearance on 21 May 2012 in a 2–1 loss against FC Brașov. Kiriță ended his career in December 2012 at Divizia B team CS Buftea, where for a while he was simultaneously the team's coach. Giani Kiriță has a total of 163 matches and 9 goals scored in Divizia A, 162 matches and 15 goals scored in Süper Lig and 15 games played, without scoring in European competitions.

International career
Giani Kiriță played four games at international level for Romania, making his debut under coach László Bölöni in a friendly which ended 1–1 against Poland. His second game played was also a friendly, a 2–2 against Slovenia. His last two appearances for the national team were at the 2002 World Cup qualifiers in a 2–0 away victory against Hungary and a 1–1 against Georgia.

Personal life
Giani Kiriță's mother considered having an abortion when she was pregnant with him, because of the problems she had with his father which included domestic violence. His father left the family when he was three years old, Giani seeing him rarely afterwards, being raised by his mother with the help of his grandmother and older sister. He married Daniela Milu in 2000 but they divorced in 2007, they have a daughter and a son together. After he ended his football career, Kiriță appeared in several TV shows in Romania, for a while having his own TV show called Giani Kiriță, antrenat la Școala Vieții (Giani Kiriță, coached at the School of Life) which aired on Antena Stars and had a amateur mixed martial arts fight that he won by knockout against Andi Constantin. Kiriță is a fan of hip hop music, being a fan of American rapper DMX, having a exact copy of his chain and for a while he had written DMX on the license plate on one of his cars, he also is a fan of Pantelimon based group B.U.G. Mafia, personally knowing the members.

Honours
Dinamo București
Divizia A: 1999–00, 2001–02
Cupa României: 1999–00, 2000–01, 2002–03
Bursaspor
Süper Lig: 2009–10

References

External links
 
 
 
 
 

1977 births
Living people
Footballers from Bucharest
Romanian footballers
Association football midfielders
Romania international footballers
AFC Rocar București players
FC Dinamo București players
MKE Ankaragücü footballers
Bursaspor footballers
Samsunspor footballers
Gaziantepspor footballers
ASA 2013 Târgu Mureș players
LPS HD Clinceni players
Romanian expatriate footballers
Expatriate footballers in Turkey
Liga I players
Liga II players
Süper Lig players
Romanian football managers
LPS HD Clinceni managers